Unite Grand Central (also known as Grand Central or Grand Central Halls) is a large complex of privately owned student housing located  on Skelhorne Street next to Lime Street station in the centre of Liverpool, England. The buildings are owned by the property developer Unite and are primarily home to students of the University of Liverpool and Liverpool John Moores University. Unite own several other student halls in Liverpool, including Cambridge Court, Capital Gate, Cedar House, Larch House, Lennon Studios and The Railyard.

The complex is located on Skelhorne Street in the L3 district of Liverpool and consists of two separate buildings. Grand Central was constructed on the site of a former bus station and was completed in 2003. It is 13 storeys high, making it one of the city's taller halls of residences. There are 1,210 rooms in Grand Central, with three different room types (en-suite, non-ensuite and studio). On site facilities include a gym and laundrette.

See also
List of LJMU halls of residence
Unite Group

References

External links
 Grand Central at Unite-student.com

Buildings and structures in Liverpool
Residential buildings completed in 2003